Sasural may refer to

 Sasural (1941 film), a 1941 Bollywood film
 Sasural (1961 film), a 1961 Hindi film
 Sasural (1984 film), a 1984 Hindi film

See also
 Sasural Simar Ka, an Indian soap opera 2011-2018